Colton Murray (born April 22, 1990) is an American former professional baseball relief pitcher. He played in Major League Baseball (MLB) for the Philadelphia Phillies. Murray signed with the team after being selected in the 13th round of the 2011 Major League Baseball draft.

Amateur career
Murray attended Olathe East High School in Olathe, Kansas, where he lettered three years in baseball for coach John McDonald. He was a two-time All-State selection in 2007 and 2008, and was named Kansas Pitcher of the Year in 2007. As a senior, he went 5–1 with a 1.55 ERA, striking out 50 hitters in 31 innings. He also hit .481 with three home runs.

Murray went on to play at the University of Kansas, where as a freshman in 2009 he went 2–3 with an ERA of 3.23, and also striking out 39 batters in 39 innings pitched. In his sophomore year in 2010, he posted a record of 1–2 with an ERA of 4.83 in 27 appearances, recording 36 strikeouts and four saves, also earning Academic All-Big 12 honors. As a junior in 2011, he went 3–4 with an ERA of 3.79 and seven saves in 20 appearances, recording 33 strikeouts.

Murray played for the Pittsfield American Defenders in summer 2009, posting a record of 1–1 and an ERA of 3.27 in 10 appearances, recording 16 strikeouts and only 3 walks as well. In summer 2010, he played for the Brewster Whitecaps of the Cape Cod League where he was named a league all-star and posted a record of 1–1 with an ERA of 0.49 and eight saves in 18 appearances. Named a Top 30 Prospect in the league by ESPN's Keith Law.

Career

Philadelphia Phillies
Murray was drafted by the Philadelphia Phillies in the 13th round of the 2011 Major League Baseball Draft. He was promoted to the major leagues on September 1, 2015. He elected free agency on November 6, 2017.

Tampa Bay Rays
On December 14, 2017, Murray signed a minor league contract with the Tampa Bay Rays. He was released on March 28, 2018.

Miami Marlins
On April 2, 2018, Murray signed a minor league contract with the Miami Marlins. He was assigned to AAA New Orleans Baby Cakes. Murray was released on June 4, 2018.

Long Island Ducks
On June 13, 2018, Murray signed with the Long Island Ducks of the Atlantic League of Professional Baseball. He became a free agent following the 2018 season.

References

External links

1990 births
Living people
Sportspeople from Overland Park, Kansas
Baseball players from Kansas
Major League Baseball pitchers
Philadelphia Phillies players
Kansas Jayhawks baseball players
Brewster Whitecaps players
Williamsport Crosscutters players
Lakewood BlueClaws players
Clearwater Threshers players
Reading Fightin Phils players
Lehigh Valley IronPigs players
Scottsdale Scorpions players
New Orleans Baby Cakes players
Long Island Ducks players